The Florsheim Shoe Company Building is a former factory for the Florsheim Shoe Company and a Chicago Landmark in the Avondale neighborhood. The building was built between 1924 and 1926 when the Florsheim Shoe Company had "2,500 employees, 71 retail outlets, 9,000 dealers and a network of regional wholesale distributors". The architect of the building was Alfred S. Alschuler, who designed numerous Chicago Landmarks and buildings on the National Register of Historic Places. The building was a factory for Florsheim until 1986, when it became the warehouse for a records management. The building, located on the 3900 block of West Belmont Avenue, is now luxury lofts. The Commission on Chicago Landmarks designated the building a Chicago Landmark on March 29, 2006.

References

Chicago Landmarks
Residential buildings completed in 1926
Residential condominiums in Chicago
Shoe factories